Xanthyris is a genus of moths in the family Geometridae erected by father and son entomologists Cajetan and Rudolf Felder.

Species 
 Xanthyris felder Felder & Felder, 1862
 Xanthyris flaveolata Linnaeus, 1758
 Xanthyris involuta Bastelberger, 1909
 Xanthyris planilimbata Warren, 1905
 Xanthyris superba Druce, 1903
 Xanthyris supergressa Bastelberger, 1909

References

Cyllopodini